Internet Girls is a young adult novel series by American author Lauren Myracle published between 2005 and 2014. The series includes four books (ttyl; ttfn; l8r, g8r; and yolo), as well as a book companion (bff: a girlfriend book you write together). The series follows best friends Maddie (madmaddie), Angela (SnowAngel), and Zoe (zoegirl) through high school. In 2004, the first book of the series, ttyl, gained attention for being the first book written entirely in the style of an instant messaging conversation.

Despite the books' positive reception, the series became the ninth-most banned book between 2000 and 2019.

Books 

 ttyl, published April 1, 2004
 ttfn, published March 1st 2006 
 l8r, g8r, published March 1st 2007 
 yolo, published August 26th 2014

Reception 
The Internet Girls series has often landed on the American Library Association's list of banned and challenged books. The books received the number seven spot in 2007, the number three spot in 2008, the number one spot in 2009 and 2011. Challengers content the book due to offensive language and sexually explicit content, as well as being unsuited for the age group and going against a religious viewpoint. Ultimately, the Internet Girls series became the ninth-most banned book between 2000 and 2019.

References

See also 

Young adult novel series
Novels set in Atlanta
Book series introduced in 2005